The 2020 WTA Elite Trophy was a women's tennis tournament to be played at the Hengqin International Tennis Center in Zhuhai, China. It was supposed to be the sixth edition of the singles event and doubles competition with 12 singles players and six doubles teams contesting the event. However, on 23rd July, 2020, the tournament was cancelled due to the decision by China's General Administration of Sport that China would not host any international sporting events in 2020 as a result of the COVID-19 pandemic.

See also
 2020 WTA Finals
 2020 ATP Finals
 2020 WTA Tour

References

External links
 Official website 

2020
Elite
WTA Elite Trophy
WTA